Exitos y Recuerdos (English: Hits and Memories) is a greatest hits collection by Selena, released nearly a year after she was killed. This album has been released with different covers and also with the name Exitos del Recuerdos the titles were "Madacy", "Rain", "Pink", "Sun", and "Special Markets". The release with the flower shirt picture has a misspelling on the back. It reads 'Come la Flor' instead of 'Como La Flor'.

Track listing
"Baila Esta Cumbia"
"Ya Ves"
"Como La Flor"
"Tengo Ganas De Llorar"
"Vuelve A Mi"
"Que Creias"
"Sukiyaki"
"Si La Quieres"
"Besitos"

Charts

Weekly charts

References

1996 greatest hits albums
Selena compilation albums
Compilation albums published posthumously